This is a list of famous or notable people from the Saint Pierre et Miquelon

Authors 
 Françoise Enguehard

Motion picture and television personalities 
 Julien Kang – television actor and model

Political and military figures 
 George Alain Frecker – politician and academic administrator.
 Henry Hughes Hough – Rear Admiral of the United States Navy and one-time military Governor of the United States Virgin Islands

Singers and musicians 
 Alexandra Hernandez
 Paula Nenette Pepin – composer, pianist and lyricist

Sportspeople 
 Nicolas Arrossamena – professional ice hockey forward who plays for Anglet Hormadi Élite of the Ligue Magnus.
 Valentin Claireaux – ice hockey player for PSG Zlín and the French national team.
 Patrick Foliot – former ice hockey goaltender
 Denis Kang – professional mixed martial artist

Saint Pierre and Miquelon-related lists
Lists of French people
People from Saint Pierre and Miquelon